Manicapsocidae is a family of Psocodea (formerly Psocoptera). It contains 8 extant species in 4 genera, with most of the species being found in the Neotropics, with one species in the Afrotropics. The extinct family Electrentomidae has been suggested to be a synonym of this family, though this has been considered premature by other scholars in the absence of cladistic analysis. Confirmed fossil species of the family are nearly as numerous as living ones, extending back to the Mid-Cretaceous.

Taxonomy 
 Manicapsocus Smithers, 1966
 M. alettae Smithers, 1966 Africa, Zimbabwe
 Epitroctes Mockford, 1967 Neotropics
 E. calypso Mockford, 1996
 E. pluvialis Mockford, 1996
 E. sanguineus Mockford, 1996
 E. sanvito Mockford, 1996
 E.. tuxtlarum Mockford, 1967
 Nothoentomum Badonnel, 1967 Neotropics
 N. palpale Badonnel, 1967
 Phallopsocus Badonnel, 1967 Neotropics
 P. carminatus Badonnel, 1967
 †Azarpsocus Maheu and Nel, 2019
 †A. perreaui Maheu and Nel, 2019 Burmese amber, Myanmar, Cenomanian
 †Eomanicapsocus Nel et al., 2005
 †E. melaniae Nel et al., 2005  Oise amber, France, Ypresian
 †Eoprotroctopsocus Nel et al., 2005
 †E. celinea Nel et al., 2005 Oise amber, France, Ypresian
 † Manicapsocidus Baz & Ortuño, 2001
 †M. enigmaticus Baz and Ortuño, 2001 Álava amber, Escucha Formation, Spain, Albian
 †Palaeomanicapsocus Azar et al., 2016 Burmese amber, Myanmar, Cenomanian
 †P. margoae Azar et al., 2016
 †P. fouadi Azar et al., 2016
 †Paramanicapsocus Hakim, Azar and Huang, 2019
 †P. longiantennatus Hakim et al., 2019 Burmese amber, Myanmar, Cenomanian

References

Psocoptera families
Troctomorpha